Gerald Robert Vizenor (born 1934) is an American writer and scholar, and an enrolled member of the Minnesota Chippewa Tribe, White Earth Reservation. Vizenor also taught for many years at the University of California, Berkeley, where he was Director of Native American Studies. With more than 30 books published, Vizenor is Professor Emeritus at the University of California, Berkeley, and Professor of American Studies at the University of New Mexico.

Early life
Gerald Vizenor was born to a mother who was Swedish-American and a father who was Anishinaabe. When he was less than two years old, his father was murdered in a homicide that was never solved.  He was raised by his mother and paternal Anishinaabe grandmother, along with a succession of paternal uncles, in Minneapolis and on the White Earth Reservation. His mother's partner acted as his informal stepfather and primary caregiver. Following that man's death in 1950, Vizenor lied about his age and at 15 entered the Minnesota National Guard.

Honorably discharged before his unit went to Korea, Vizenor joined the army two years later. He served with occupation forces in Japan, as that nation was still struggling to recover from the vast destruction of the nuclear attacks that ended World War II. During this period, he began to learn about the Japanese poetic form of haiku. Later he wrote Hiroshima Bugi (2004), what he called his "kabuki novel."

Returning to the United States in 1953, Vizenor took advantage of G.I. Bill funding to complete his undergraduate degree at New York University. He followed this with postgraduate study at Harvard University and the University of Minnesota, where he also undertook graduate teaching. After returning to Minnesota, he married and had a son.

Activism
After teaching at the university, between 1964 and 1968, Vizenor worked as a community advocate. During this time he served as director of the American Indian Employment and Guidance Center in Minneapolis, Minnesota, which brought him into close contact with numerous Native Americans from reservations. Many found it difficult to live in the city, and struggled against white racism and cheap alcohol.

This period is the subject of his short-story collection Wordarrows: Whites and Indians in the New Fur Trade, some of which was inspired by his experiences. His work with homeless and poor Natives may have been the reason Vizenor looked askance at the emerging American Indian Movement (AIM), seeing radical leaders such as Dennis Banks and Clyde Bellecourt as being more concerned with personal publicity than the "real" problems faced by American Indians.

Vizenor began working as a staff reporter on the Minneapolis Tribune, quickly rising to become an editorial contributor. He investigated the case of Thomas James White Hawk, convicted of murder. Vizenor's perspective allowed him to raise difficult questions about the nature of justice in a society dealing with colonized peoples. His work was credited with enabling White Hawk to have his death sentence commuted.

During this period Vizenor coined the phrase "cultural schizophrenia" to describe the state of mind of many Natives, who he considered torn between Native and White cultures. His investigative journalism into American Indian activists revealed drug dealing, personal failings, and failures of leadership among some of the movement's leaders. As a consequence of his articles, he was personally threatened.

Academic career
Beginning teaching full-time at Lake Forest College, Illinois, Vizenor was appointed to set up and run the Native American Studies program at Bemidji State University. Later he became professor of American Indian Studies at the University of Minnesota in Minneapolis (1978–1985). He later satirized the academic world in some of his fiction.  During this time he also served as a visiting professor at Tianjin University, China.

Vizenor worked and taught for four years at the University of California, Santa Cruz, where he was also Provost of Kresge College. He had an endowed chair for one year at the University of Oklahoma. Vizenor next was appointed as a professor at the University of California, Berkeley. He is professor of American Studies at the University of New Mexico.

Vizenor was influenced by the French post-modernist intellectuals, particularly Jacques Derrida and Jean Baudrillard.

Fiction
Vizenor has published collections of haiku, poems, plays, short stories, translations of traditional tribal tales, screenplays, and many novels. He has been named as a member of the literary movement which Kenneth Lincoln dubbed the Native American Renaissance, a flourishing of literature and art beginning in the mid-20th century.

His first novel, Darkness in Saint Louis Bearheart (1978), later revised as Bearheart: The Heirship Chronicles (1990), brought him immediate attention. One of the few science fiction novels written by a Native American, it portrayed a procession of tribal pilgrims through a surreal, dystopian landscape of an America suffering an environmental apocalypse brought on by white greed for oil. Simultaneously postmodern and deeply traditional, inspired by N. Scott Momaday's pioneering works, Vizenor drew on poststructuralist theory and Anishinaabe trickster stories to portray a world in the grip of what he called "terminal creeds" – belief systems incapable of change.  In one of the most noted and controversial passages, the character Belladonna Darwin Winter-Catcher proclaims that Natives are better and purer than whites. She is killed with poisoned cookies, purportedly for her promoting racial separatism.

In Vizenor's subsequent novels, he used a shifting and overlapping cast of trickster figures in settings ranging from China to White Earth Reservation to the University of Kent. Frequently quoting European philosophers such as Umberto Eco, Roland Barthes and Jean Baudrillard, Vizenor has written a fiction that is allusive, humorous and playful, but deeply serious in portraying the state of Native America. He has refused to romanticize the figure of the Native and opposes continued oppression. Vizenor's major theme is that the idea of "Indian" as one people was an "invention" of European invaders. Before Columbus arrived, no one defined Indian as other; there were only the indigenous peoples of various tribes (such as Anishinaabe or Dakota). (They defined "other" among themselves, often divided by languages and associated cultures.)

To deconstruct the idea of "Indianness," Vizenor uses strategies of irony and Barthesian jouissance. For instance, in the lead-up to Columbus Day in 1992, he published the novel, The Heirs of Columbus, in which Columbus is portrayed as a Mayan Indian trying to return home to Central America. In Hotline Healers, he claims that Richard Nixon, the American president who he said did more for American Indians than any other in restoring sovereign rights and supporting self-determination, did so as part of a deal in exchange for traditional "virtual reality" technology.

Non-fiction
Vizenor has written several studies of Native American affairs, including Manifest Manners and Fugitive Poses. He has edited several collections of academic work related to Native American writing. He is the founder-editor of the American Indian Literature and Critical Studies series at the University of Oklahoma Press, which has provided an important venue for critical work on and by Native writers.

In his own studies, Vizenor has worked to deconstruct the semiotics of Indianness. His title, Fugitive Poses is derived from Vizenor's assertion that the term Indian is a social-science construction that replaces native peoples, who become absent or "fugitive". Similarly, the term, "manifest manners," refers to the continued legacy of Manifest Destiny. He wrote that native peoples were still bound by "narratives of dominance" that replace them with "Indians". In place of a unified "Indian" signifier, he suggests that Native peoples be referred to by specific tribal identities, to be properly placed in their particular tribal context, just as most Americans would distinguish among the French, Poles, Germans and English.

In order to cover more general Native studies, Vizenor suggests using the term, "postindian," to convey that the disparate, heterogeneous tribal cultures were "unified" and could be addressed en masse only by Euro-American attitudes and actions towards them. He has also promoted the neologism of "survivance", a cross between the words "survival" and "resistance." he uses it to replace "survival" in terms of tribal peoples. He coined it to imply a process rather than an end, as the ways of tribal peoples continue to change (as do the ways of others). He also notes that the survival of tribal peoples as distinct from majority cultures, is based in resistance.

He continues to criticize both Native American nationalism and Euro-American colonial attitudes.

Honors
Both his fiction and academic studies have contributed to his being honored as a major Anishinaabe and American intellectual and writer.
1983, Film-in-the-Cities Award, Sundance Festival
1984, Best American Indian Film, San Francisco Film Festival
1986, New York Fiction Collective Award
1988, American Book Award for
1988, New York Fiction Collective Prize
1989, Artists Fellowship in Literature, California Arts Council, 1989
1990, PEN Oakland/Josephine Miles Literary Award
1996, PEN Excellence Award
2001, Lifetime Achievement Award, Native Writers' Circle of the Americas
2005, Distinguished Achievement Award, Western Literature Association
2005, Distinguished Minnesotan, Bemidji State University
2011, MELUS Lifetime Achievement Award, 2011.
2011, American Book Award for Shrouds of White Earth (2011).
2020, Lifetime Achievement Award, Paul Bartlett Re Peace Prize 
2021, Honorary Curator, American Haiku Archives

Bibliography

Fiction
Blue Ravens (Wesleyan University Press, 2014)
Shrouds of White Earth (SUNY P)
Father Meme (U of New Mexico P)
Hiroshima Bugi: Atomu 57 (Nebraska UP)
Chancers (Oklahoma UP)
Hotline Healers: An Almost Browne Novel (Wesleyan UP)
Bearheart: The Heirship Chronicles (Minnesota UP) (revised version of Darkness in Saint Louis Bearheart)
The Heirs of Columbus (Wesleyan UP)
Griever: An American Monkey King in China (Minnesota UP)
The Trickster of Liberty: Tribal Heirs to a Wild Baronage (Emergent Literatures)
Earthdivers: Tribal Narratives on Mixed Descent (Minnesota UP)
Landfill Meditation: Crossblood Stories (Wesleyan UP)
Dead Voices: Natural Agonies In The New World (U. of Oklahoma Press)
Chair of Tears (U of Nebraska Press)

Non-fiction
Thomas James Whitehawk: Investigative Narrative in the Trial, Capital Punishment, and Commutation of the Death Sentence of Thomas James Whitehawk (Four Winds Press, 1968)
Touchwood : A Collection of Ojibway Prose (Many Minnesotas Project, No 3) (New Rivers Press)
The People Named the Chippewa: Narrative Histories (Minnesota UP)
The Everlasting Sky; New Voices from the People Named the Chippewa (MacMillan)
Manifest Manners: Postindian Warriors of Survivance (Wesleyan UP) (later renamed Manifest Manners: Narratives on Postindian Survivance)
Crossbloods; Bone Courts, Bingo, and Other Reports (Minnesota UP)
Wordarrows: Indians and Whites in the New Fur Trade (Minnesota UP)
Shadow Distance: A Gerald Vizenor Reader (Wesleyan UP)
Fugitive Poses: Native American Indian Scenes of Absence and Presence (Nebraska UP, 1998)
Native Liberty: Natural Reason and Cultural Survivance (Nebraska UP, 2009)

Poetry
Poems Born in the Wind (1960)
The Old Park Sleepers (1961)
Two Wings the Butterfly (privately printed, 1962)
South of the Painted Stones (1963)
Summer in the Spring: Anishinaabe Lyric Poems and Stories (Oklahoma UP)
Slight Abrasions: A Dialogue in Haiku, with Jerome Downes (Nodin Press, 1966)
Water Striders (Moving Parts Press)
Seventeen Chirps (Nodin Press)
Raising the Moon Vines (Nodin Press)
Matsushima : Pine Island (Nodin Press, 1984)
 Cranes Arise: Haiku Scenes (Nodin Press, 1999)
Empty Swings (Haiku in English Series) (Nodin Press)
Bear Island: The War At Sugar Point (Minnesota UP, 2006)
Almost Ashore (Salt Publishing, 2006)
Quasi en terra (Valencia, Denes, 2009), transl. Carme Manuel Cuenca

Screenplays
Harold of Orange (1984)

Edited anthology
Native American Literature: A Brief Introduction and Anthology (1997)

Edited collections of essays
Narrative Chance: Postmodern Discourse on Native American Indian Literatures (Oklahoma UP)
Survivance: Narratives of Native Presence (Nebraska UP, 2008)

Autobiography
Interior Landscapes: Autobiographical Myths and Metaphors (Minnesota UP)
Postindian Conversations, with A. Robert Lee (Nebraska UP)

See also

List of thinkers influenced by deconstruction

Notes
This article incorporates text from Nativewiki under the GFDL license.

Further reading

Monographs and essay collections on Vizenor's work
Gerald Vizenor: Writing in the Oral Tradition, by Kimberley Blaeser
Loosening the Seams: Interpretations of Gerald Vizenor, by A. Robert Lee
Four American Indian Literary Masters: N. Scott Momaday, James Welch, Leslie Marmon Silko and Gerald Vizenor, by Alan R. Velie
Gerald Vizenor: Profils Americains 20, ed. Simone Pellerin. Presses Universitaires de la Méditerranée, 2007. (In English)
Gerald Vizenor: Texts and Contexts, ed. A. Robert Lee and Deborah Madsen, 2011.
Understanding Gerald Vizenor, by Deborah Madsen, 2010.
The Poetry and Poetics of Gerald Vizenor, by Deborah Madsen, 2012.

Journals
Transmotion: Journal of Vizenor Studies and Indigenous Studies, ed. David J. Carlson, James Mackay, David Stirrup and Laura Adams Weaver.

Anthologies 
I Tell You Now: Autobiographical Essays by Native American Writers
Visit Teepee Town: Native Writings After the Detours, Diane Glancy, Mark Nowak (Editors), Coffeehouse Press.
Stories Migrating Home: Anishnaabe Prose, Kimberly Blaeser (Editor), Loonfeather Press: Wisconsin
Talking Leaves: Contemporary Native American Short Stories, Craig Lesley, Katheryn Stavrakis (Editor) Dell Books
Earth Song, Sky Spirit: Short Stories of the Contemporary Native American Experience, Clifford E. Trafzer (Editor)
Earth Power Coming: Short Fiction in Native American Literature, Simon J. Ortiz (editor), Navajo Community College Press
Songs from This Earth on Turtle's Back: An Anthology of Poetry by American Indian Writers, Joseph Bruchac (Editor), Greenfield Review Press
Smoke Rising: The Native North American Literary Companion, Janet Witalec, Visible Ink Press.
Words in the Blood: Contemporary Indian Writers of North and South America, Jamake Highwater (Editor), New American Library.
Blue Dawn, Red Earth: New Native American Storytellers, Clifford E. Trafzer (Editor), Anchor Books
The Lightning Within: An Anthology of Contemporary American Indian Fiction, Edited and with an Introduction by Alan R. Velie, University of Nebraska Press.
American Indian Literature: An Anthology, Alan R. Velie, University of Oklahoma Press.
Harper's Anthology of 20th century Native American Poetry, Duane Niatum (Editor) HarperCollins
Twenty Six Minnesota Writers, Monico D. Degrazia (Editor), Nodin Press.
After Yesterday's Crash: The Avant-Pop Anthology, Larry McCaffery (Editor), Penguin USA
The New Native American Novel: Works in Progress, Mary Bartlett (Editor), University of New Mexico Press.
The Writer's Notebook, Howard Junker, HarperCollins.
Listening to Ourselves: More Stories from 'the Sound of Writing''', Alan Cheuse, Caroline Marshall (Editor), Anchor Books.Avant-Pop: Fiction for a Daydream Nation, Larry McCaffery (Editor), Fc2/Black Ice BooksBefore Columbus Foundation Fiction Anthology: Selections from the American Book Awards 1980–1990, Ishmael Reed, Kathryn Trueblood, Shawn Wong (Editor), W W Norton & Co.Without Discovery: A Native Response to Columbus (Turning Point Series), Ray Gonzalez (Editor), Broken Moon Press.A Gathering of Flowers: Stories About Being Young in America, Joyce Carol Thomas (Editor), Harpercollins Juvenile Books.American Short Fiction, Spring 1991 by Laura Furman, University of Texas Press.An Illuminated History of the Future by Curtis White (Editor), Fc2/Black Ice Books.Fiction International, San Diego State University Press.An Other Tongue: Nation and Ethnicity in the Linguistic Borderlands, Alfred Arteaga (Editor), Duke University Press.Contemporary Archaeology in Theory, (Social Archaeology), Robert Preucel (Editor), Ian Hodder (Editor), Blackwell Pub.Encyclopedia of North American Indians, by Frederick E. Hoxie (Editor), Houghton Mifflin Co.A Companion to American Thought (Blackwell Reference), Richard Wightman Fox (Editor), James T. Kloppenberg (Editor), Blackwell Pub.Culture and the Imagination, Proceedings of the Third Stuttgart Seminar on Cultural Studies, Verlag Für Wissenschaft und Forschung, Stuttgart, Germany, 1995From Different Shores: Perspectives on Race and Ethnicity in America, Ronald Takaki (Editor), Oxford University Press.

 Interviews 
"Constitutional Narratives: A Conversation with Gerald Vizenor," Gerald Vizenor and James Mackay. In Centering Anishinaabeg Studies: Understanding the World through Stories, ed. Jill Doerfler, Niiganwewidam James Sinclair and Heidi Kiiwetinepinesiik Stark, (East Lansing: Michigan State University Press, 2013)Postindian Conversations, Gerald Robert Vizenor, A. Robert Lee, University of Nebraska Press.Excavating Voices: Listening to Photographs of Native Americans, Michael Katakis (Editor), University of Pennsylvania Museum Press.Mythic Rage and Laughter: An Interview with Gerald Vizenor, Dallas Miller, 1995, Studies in American Indian Literatures, 7, 77, 1995 Survival This Way: Interviews With American Indian Poets, Joseph Bruchac III (Editor), (Sun Tracks Books, No 15) University of Arizona Press.Winged Words: American Indian Writers Speak, Laura Coltelli, University of Nebraska Press.Contemporary Authors. Autobiography Series (Vol 22. ), Gale ResearchAmerican Contradictions: Interviews With Nine American Writers, Wolfgang Binder (Editor), Helmbrecht Breinig (Editor), Wesleyan University Press.
First published in German as Facing America, Multikulturelle Literatur def heutigen USA in Texten und Interviews, Rotpunktverlag, Leipzig, Germany, 1994.I Tell You Now: Autobiographical Essays by Native American Writers, Brian Swann, Arnold Krupat, Brompton Books Corp.

Essays on Vizenor's workContemporary Authors: Biography – Vizenor, Gerald Robert (1934–), Thomson Gale.Other Words: American Indian Literature, Law, and Culture, (American Indian Literature and Critical Studies Series), Jace Weaver, Univ. Oklahoma Press.Subverting the Dominant Paradigm: Gerald Vizenor's Trickster Discourse, Kerstin Schmidt, Studies in American Indian Literatures, 7, 65, 1995 Spring.That the People Might Live: Native American Literatures and Native American Community, Jace Weaver, Oxford University Press.Text as trickster: postmodern language games in Gerald Vizenor's 'Bearheart.' (Maskers and Tricksters), An article from: MELUS, by Elizabeth BlairGerald Vizenor and his 'Heirs of Columbus': a postmodern quest for more discourse. An article from: The American Indian Quarterly by Barry E LagaMonkey kings and mojo: postmodern ethnic humor in Kingston, Reed, and Vizenor, An article from: MELUS, by John Lowe
"Vizenorian Jurisprudence: Legal Interventions, Narrative Shadows and Other Interpretive Possibilities," (Critical Essay) by Juana Maria Rodriguez in Loosening the Seams: Interpretations of Gerald Vizenor, edited by A. Robert Lee, 2000.
"Real Stories: Memory, Violence, and Enjoyment in Vizenor's 'Bearheart'" by Jon Hauss in 'Literature & Psychology,' Fall 1995.Postmodern bears in the texts of Gerald Vizenor (Critical Essay), An article from: MELUS, by Nora Baker Barry"Bad Breath": Gerald Vizenor's Lacanian fable. (Critical Essay), An article from: Studies in Short Fiction by Linda Lizut HelsternNative American Writers of the United States, (Dictionary of Literary Biography, V. 175), Kenneth M. Roemer (Editor), Gale Research.Woodland word warrior: An introduction to the works of Gerald Vizenor, A. LaVonne Brown Ruoff.
"Gerald Vizenor's Shadow Plays: Narrative Meditations and Multiplicities of Power" (Critical Essay) by Juana Maria Rodriguez in SAIL (Studies in American Indian Literatures), (October 1, 1993): 23–30.Partial Recall: With Essays on Photographs of Native North Americans, Lucy Lippard (Editor)Native American Autobiography: An Anthology (Wisconsin Studies in American Autobiography), Arnold Krupat (Editor), University of Wisconsin Press.Growing Up in Minnesota: Ten Writers Remember Their Childhoods, Chester G. Anderson, University of Minnesota Press.Inheriting the Land: Contemporary Voices from the Midwest, Mark Vinz (Editor), Thom Tammaro (Editor), University of Minnesota Press.
Gerald Vizenor, a special edition, Louis Owens (Editor), Studies in American Indian Literatures, Volume 9, Number 1, Spring 1997, including:
"Interior Dancers": Transformations of Vizenor's Poetic Vision, Kimberly M. BlaeserThe Ceded Landscape of Gerald Vizenor's Fiction, Chris LaLondeBlue Smoke and Mirrors: Griever's Buddhist Heart, Linda Lizut HelsternLiberation and Identity: Bearing the Heart of The Heirship Chronicles, Andrew McClureLiminal Landscapes: Motion, Perspective and Place in Gerald Vizenor's Fiction, Bradley John MonsmaWaiting for Ishi: Gerald Vizenor's Ishi and the Wood Ducks and Samuel Beckett's Waiting for Godot, Elvira PulitanoDoubling in Gerald Vizenor's Bearheart: The Pilgrimage Strategy or Bunyan Revisited, Bernadette Rigel-CellardLegal and Tribal Identity in Gerald Vizenor's The Heirs of Columbus, Stephen D. OsborneOther Destinies: Understanding the American Indian Novel, (American Indian Literature and Critical Studies, Vol 3), Louis Owens, University of Oklahoma Press.Mediation in Contemporary Native American Fiction (American Indian Literature and Critical Studies, Vol 15), James Ruppert, University of Oklahoma Press.Native American Perspectives on Literature and History, (American Indian Literature and Critical Studies Series, Vol 19) by Alan R. Velie (Editor), University of Oklahoma Press.
(Articles by Juana Maria Rodriguez, Alan R. Velie, Robert Alan Warrior and Kimberley Blaeser address Vizenor's writings.)The Turn to the Native, by Arnold Krupat, University of Nebraska Press.Cultural Difference and the Literary Text: Pluralism and the Limits of Authenticity in North American Literatures, Edited by Winfried Siemerling and Katrin SchwenkBuried Roots and Indestructible Seeds: The Survival of American Indian Life in Story, History, and Spirit, Martin Zanger (Editor), Mark A. Lindquist, University of Wisconsin Press.Sacred Trusts: Essays on Stewardship and Responsibility, Michael Katakis, Russell Chatham (Illustrator), Mercury House.Native American Testimony: A Chronicle of Indian-White Relations from Prophecy to Present, 1492–1992, Peter Nabokov, Penguin USAOut There: Marginalization and Contemporary Cultures, Russell Ferguson, Martha Gever, Mit Press.Listening to Native Americans: Making Peace with the Past for the Future, John Barry Ryan, in Listening: Journal of Religion and Culture, Vol. 31, No.1 Winter 1996 pp. 24–36.Transformation in Progress by Annalee Newitz and Jillian Sandell, in Bad Subjects, an online journal.Spring Wind Rising: The American Indian Novel and the Problem of History, Stripes, James D., A dissertation.

 Textbooks The McGraw-Hill Introduction to Literature, Gilbert H. Muller, McGraw Hill Text.Ways in: Approaches to Reading and Writing About Literature, Gilbert H. Muller, John A. Williams, McGraw Hill Text.The Harper American Literature, Volume 1; 2nd Edition, Donald McQuade, Robert Atwan, Martha Banta, Justin Kaplan, Harpercollins College Div.

External links
 
 Gerald Robert Vizenor Papers. Yale Collection of American Literature, Beinecke Rare Book and Manuscript Library.
 
 Vizenor biography at Minnesota Historical Society site
 Salt Publishing website for Almost Ashore, includes video footage, excerpts and biography
Gerald Vizenor, Native American Authors Project
Interview with “The Berkleyan”
Talk at University of Minnesota 2006
"Genocide Tribunals: Native Human Rights and Survivance" - University of Minnesota, October 10, 2006
Stone Babies from Weber StudiesGerald Vizenor in Dialogue with A. Robert Lee, Weber Studies''

1934 births
20th-century Native Americans
21st-century Native Americans
20th-century American novelists
21st-century American novelists
American autobiographers
American investigative journalists
American literary critics
American literary theorists
American male novelists
American people of Swedish descent
Harvard University alumni
Lake Forest College faculty
Living people
Native American academics
Native American journalists
Native American novelists
Native American poets
Native American studies
Native Americans' rights activists
New York University alumni
Ojibwe people
University of Minnesota alumni
University of California, Berkeley faculty
University of New Mexico faculty
Writers from Minneapolis
Native American short story writers
Native American essayists
20th-century American poets
21st-century American poets
20th-century short story writers
21st-century American short story writers
20th-century essayists
21st-century essayists
PEN Oakland/Josephine Miles Literary Award winners
American Book Award winners
Novelists from Illinois
Novelists from Minnesota
21st-century American non-fiction writers
American male non-fiction writers
White Earth Band of Ojibwe
English-language haiku poets
20th-century American male writers
21st-century American male writers